The Dutch Sportsman and Sportswoman of the Year are chosen annually by Dutch athletes from a shortlist compiled by sports journalists. The elections are organized by the Dutch Olympic Committee. All the winners receive a Jaap Eden Award to remember their title.

Sportsperson of the Year (1951–1958) 

Source: NOC*NSF

Sportsman & sportswoman of the Year (from 1959)

Disabled sportsman or sportswoman of the Year (from 2002) 

Source: NOC*NSF

See also
Dutch Footballer of the Year
 Amsterdam Sportsman of the year
 Rotterdam Sportsman of the year

References

Dutch sports trophies and awards
National sportsperson-of-the-year trophies and awards
Awards established in 1951
1951 establishments in the Netherlands
Annual sporting events in the Netherlands